George Watson (June 6, 1881 – death date unknown) was an American Negro league third baseman in the 1910s.

Watson played for the Louisville White Sox in 1914 and 1915. In six recorded games with Louisville, he posted five hits in 23 plate appearances.

References

External links
Baseball statistics and player information from Baseball-Reference Black Baseball Stats and Seamheads

1881 births
Year of death missing
Place of birth missing
Place of death missing
Louisville White Sox players
Baseball third basemen